Charles Lanusse (25 August 1896 – 14 February 1976) was a French cyclist. He competed in the men's sprint event at the 1920 Summer Olympics.

References

External links
 

1896 births
1976 deaths
Cyclists at the 1920 Summer Olympics
French male cyclists
Olympic cyclists of France
Sportspeople from Bordeaux
Cyclists from Nouvelle-Aquitaine